The Canton of Neufchâteau is a rural French administrative and electoral grouping of communes in the Vosges département of eastern France and in the region of Grand Est. The canton has its administrative centre at Neufchâteau.

Composition
At the French canton reorganisation which came into effect in March 2015, the canton was expanded from 25 to 47 communes:

Attignéville
Autigny-la-Tour
Autreville
Avranville
Barville
Bazoilles-sur-Meuse
Beaufremont
Brechainville
Certilleux
Chermisey
Circourt-sur-Mouzon
Clérey-la-Côte
Coussey
Domrémy-la-Pucelle
Frebécourt
Fréville
Grand
Greux
Harchéchamp
Harmonville
Houéville
Jainvillotte
Jubainville
Landaville
Lemmecourt
Liffol-le-Grand
Martigny-les-Gerbonvaux
Maxey-sur-Meuse
Midrevaux
Moncel-sur-Vair
Mont-lès-Neufchâteau
Neufchâteau
Pargny-sous-Mureau
Pompierre
Punerot
Rebeuville
Rollainville
Rouvres-la-Chétive
Ruppes
Sartes
Seraumont
Sionne
Soulosse-sous-Saint-Élophe
Tilleux
Trampot
Tranqueville-Graux
Villouxel

References

Neufchateau